Perumapalayam is a small village located in kanjikoil panchayat town in Erode district in the Indian state of Tamil Nadu, 18 km from Erode and 8 km from Perundurai.

People
The town houses approximately 150 people, most of which have agricultural-related jobs. The village has one school, which provides schooling up to the 5th grade.

Temples
Perumapalyam has a major temple Thottichi mariaamman  and vinayagar temples. This temple celebrates the festival every year in January for 8 days. This includes Poo poduthal, Kambam naduthal, Poovodu eduthal, Theertham selluthal, Maa vilaku, Pogal vaithu kidai vettuthal, Kambam eduthal & maru poojai. 
The village has one more temple Sri.Mahaliamman.

Villages in Erode district